is a town located in Kumage District, Yamaguchi Prefecture, Japan.

Geography

Islands 

 Iwaishima
 Yashima
 Nagashima

Neighbouring municipalities 

 Yanai
 Hirao

Transportation 
Kaminoseki does not have any train stations, the closest one being Yanai Station, which is located about 20 kilometers from the town.

References

External links 
  (in Japanese)

Towns in Yamaguchi Prefecture